Alexander McNab (11 January 1887 — 18 May 1943) was a Scottish first-class cricketer.

McNab was born at Uddingston in January 1887, where he was educated at Uddingston Grammar School. A club cricketer for Uddingston, he made a single appearance in first-class cricket for Scotland against Ireland at Dublin in 1910. Batting twice in the match, firstly from the tail, he ended the Scotland first innings unbeaten on 0, while in their second innings he was dismissed without scoring by Gus Kelly, having been promoted up the batting order from number eleven to open. With his right-arm medium pace bowling, he bowled eleven wicketless overs across the match. McNab later emigrated to the United States, where he died in May 1943 at Camden, New Jersey.

References

External links
 

1887 births
1943 deaths
People from Uddingston
People educated at Uddingston Grammar School
Scottish cricketers
British emigrants to the United States